Amphiboloidea is a taxonomic superfamily of air-breathing land snails.

Distribution 
Amphibolids are found in Indo-Pacific intertidal mangrove, saltmarsh and estuarine mudflat habitats.

Taxonomy

2005 taxonomy 
According to the taxonomy of the Gastropoda (Bouchet & Rocroi, 2005), it is a superfamily in the informal group Basommatophora, within the Pulmonata.

This superfamily has contained only one family, the Amphibolidae.

2007 taxonomy 
Golding et al. (2007) have established new families:
 Maningrididae Golding, Ponder & Byrne, 2007 - with the only species Maningrida arnhemensis
 Phallomedusidae Golding, Ponder & Byrne, 2007

2010 taxonomy 
Basommatophora (Siphonarioidea and Amphiboloidea and Hygrophila) have been found polyphyletic and so Jörger et al. (2010) have moved Amphiboloidea to Panpulmonata.

References

Further reading 
 Golding R. E., Byrne M., Ponder W. F. (2008) "Novel copulatory structures and reproductive functions in Amphiboloidea (Gastropoda, Heterobranchia, Pulmonata)". Invertebrate Biology 127(2): 168–180 

Panpulmonata
Taxa named by John Edward Gray